Zakari Ziblim (born 3 April 1925) is a Ghanaian politician who was a member of the first parliament of the second republic of Ghana, representing Nanumba constituency in the Northern Region under the membership of the Progress Party (PP).

Early life and education
Ziblim was born on 3 April 1925 and lived in Nanumba a town in tamale in the Northern Region of Ghana, He attended Tamale Middle Boarding School and Tamale Government Teacher Training College. where he obtained a Teachers' Training Certificate and later worked as a teacher before going into Parliament.

Politics
Ziblim began his political career in 1969 as a parliamentary candidate for the constituency of Nanumba in the Northern Region of Ghana prior to the commencement of the 1969 Ghanaian parliamentary election.

Ziblim was sworn into the First Parliament of the Second Republic of Ghana on 1 October 1969, after being pronounced winner at the 1969 Ghanaian election held on 26 August 1969. His tenure of office as a member  of parliament ended on 13 January 1972.

Personal life
Ziblim was a Muslim.

References

1925 births
Possibly living people
People from Tamale, Ghana
Ghanaian Muslims
Progress Party (Ghana) politicians
Ghanaian MPs 1969–1972